Diwan Bahadur Sir Vembakkam Bhashyam Aiyangar  (January 1844 – 18 November 1908) was an eminent lawyer and jurist who served as the first Indian Advocate-General of  Madras Province and also as a Judge of the Madras High Court.

Posts held 
Bhashyam Aiyangar served as the Acting Advocate General of Madras from February 1897 to  March 1898 and September 1899 to March 1900. He was the first Indian to hold the post. In February 1897, Bhashyam Aiyangar was nominated to the Madras Legislative Council as an official member He was nominated for two more terms in November 1899 and March 1900.

In July 1901, Bhashyam Aiyangar was appointed a Judge of the High Court at Madras, in which position he served until 1904.

Honours 

Bhashyam Aiyangar was created a Companion of the Indian Empire in May 1895. He was knighted on 5 February 1900, after a knighthood had been announced in the 1900 New Year Honours list.

A statute of Bhashyam Aiyangar was donated by M. S. Nagappa in 1927 and has been installed in the Madras High Court campus, just outside the Madras Bar Association entrance.

Personal life 

Bhashyam Aiyangar had a number of daughters. His third daughter was married to eminent lawyer and freedom fighter S. Srinivasa Iyengar. The Indian independence activist Ambujammal is his granddaughter. Actor Utkarsh Ambudkar is a descendant of Aiyangar.

Notes

References 

 
 

1844 births
1908 deaths
19th-century Indian lawyers
People from British India
Companions of the Order of the Indian Empire
Knights Bachelor
Indian Knights Bachelor
Lawyers awarded knighthoods
Advocates General for Tamil Nadu
Members of the Madras Legislative Council
20th-century Indian lawyers
People from Tiruvannamalai district
Dewan Bahadurs